The 1864 State of the Union Address was given by Abraham Lincoln, the 16th president of the United States.  It was presented to the United States Congress on Tuesday, December 6, 1864.  It was given right before the end of the American Civil War. He said: "The war continues. Since the last annual message all the important lines and positions then occupied by our forces have been maintained and our arms have steadily advanced, thus liberating the regions left in rear, so that Missouri, Kentucky, Tennessee, and parts of other States have again produced reasonably fair crops. The most remarkable feature in the military operations of the year is General Sherman's attempted march of 300 miles directly through the insurgent region."

References

State of the Union addresses
Presidency of Abraham Lincoln
Works by Abraham Lincoln
38th United States Congress
State of the Union Address
State of the Union Address
State of the Union Address
State of the Union Address
Politics of the American Civil War
December 1864 events
State of the Union